Walthari (also Waltheri) son of Wacho from his third wife Silinga, was a king of the Lombards from 539 to 546. He was an infant king, and rulership of the kingdom was administered by Audoin. Audoin probably killed Waltari before he reached manhood, in order to gain the throne for himself around 546, and led the Lombards into Pannonia. Procopius mentions he died of disease. He was the last of the Lething Dynasty.

Notes 

546 deaths
6th-century Lombard monarchs
Lethings
Year of birth unknown